Fiorio is a surname. Notable people with the surname include:

Alex Fiorio (born 1965), Italian rally driver
Bill Fiorio known as Duke Tumatoe (born 1947), American blues guitarist, vocalist and songwriter
Cesare Fiorio (born 1939), Italian racing driver and Formula One sporting director
Giorgia Fiorio (born 1967), Italien photographer, artist and essayist

See also 
Caffè Fiorio, is a historic café in Turin, northern Italy